Kozağacı (literally "walnut tree" in Turkish) may refer to the following places in Turkey:

 Kozağacı, Burdur, a town in the district of Çavdır, Burdur Province
 Kozağacı, Gündoğmuş, a village in the district of Gündoğmuş, Antalya Province
 Kozağacı, Korkuteli, a village in the district of Korkuteli, Antalya Province
 Kozağacı Dam

See also
 Kozağaç (disambiguation), different form of the same word